Harold Joseph Pringle (14 January 1920 - 5 July 1945) was the only soldier of the Canadian Army to be executed during the Second World War.

Pringle was born in the small hamlet of Flinton, Ontario, near Napanee.  He and his father tried to enlist in The Hastings and Prince Edward Regiment of the Canadian Army. On medical examination, he was accepted, but his father was turned away due to poor eyesight.  Harold Pringle was formally enrolled in the army in February, 1940, aged 20.

Pringle was a disciplinary problem for his unit, going AWOL many times, and he was sent to a reformatory camp for a year. He escaped after serving six months there and was sent to Italy where he was posted to the 1st Battalion, The Hastings and Prince Edward Regiment, as a private with the service number C/5292. Pringle's combat record after the escape was unblemished until after the battle for the Hitler Line in central Italy, when he deserted to Rome to join the Sailor Gang.

The Sailor Gang, though only five members strong, was similar to the larger and better organized Lane Gang—both gangs were made up of military deserters who smuggled goods into Rome for the black market. The members of the Sailor Gang lived pleasantly for many months, but then things started going downhill. They were almost always drunk, got into fights, and made rash decisions, to the point where one of their members shot another. They tried to take him to the local field hospital, and all of his gang (except one who was given immunity for his testimony at their trials) alleged that he died on the way, claiming also that Pringle and the gang leader shot the man after he was dead several times so it would look like a Mafia killing. The dead gang member, a Canadian soldier named John (Lucky) McGillivary, was discovered and police apprehended almost all the members of the Sailor Gang, along with the members of the similar, but larger, Lane Gang.

The various gang members were tried, and Pringle was sentenced to death for murder. An appeal against the decision was rejected. On 5 July 1945, Pringle was executed by a Canadian Army firing squad. He was buried in grave number 11, row B, plot VII at Caserta CWGC Cemetery in Italy.

References

Bibliography
 Clark, Andrew (2002) A Keen Soldier: the Execution of Second World War Private Harold Joseph Pringle  Alfred A. Knopf, Canada, Toronto, 
 Madsen, Chris (1999) Another Kind of Justice: Canadian Military Law from Confederation to Somalia UBC Press, Vancouver, 

1920 births
1945 deaths
20th-century executions by Canada
Canadian Army soldiers
Military history of Canada
Military discipline and World War II
Canadian Army personnel of World War II
Canadian people convicted of murder
Executed Canadian people
People convicted of murder by Canada
People executed by Canada by firing squad
People executed for murder
People who were court-martialed
Hastings and Prince Edward Regiment